Santokhi is a surname. Notable people with the surname include:

Chan Santokhi (born 1959), President of Suriname since 2020
Santokhi cabinet, his cabinet since 2020
Mellisa Santokhi-Seenacherry (born 1983), First Lady of Suriname

Hindu surnames